Chupaca Province, located in Central Peru, is one of the nine provinces that compose the Junín Region, bordering to the north with the Concepción Province, to the east with the Huancayo Province, to the south with the Huancavelica Region, and to the west with the Lima Region. The province has a population of approximately 57,000 inhabitants, and the capital is Chupaca.

Geography 

Other mountains are listed below:

Political division
The province is divided into nine districts (with main towns).

 Ahuac District (Ahuac)
 Chongos Bajo District (Chongos Bajo)
 Chupaca District (Chupaca)
 Huachac District (Huachac)
 Huamancaca Chico District (Huamancaca Chico)
 San Juan de Jarpa District (Jarpa)
 San Juan de Yscos District (Yscos)
 Tres de Diciembre District (Tres de Diciembre)
 Yanacancha District (Yanacancha)

Places of interest and importance 
 Huayao -  from Huancayo; facilities including a Geophysical Observatory, where meteorological studies, nuclear physics, and other topics are studied.
 Ñawinpukyu - The name of the lake comes from a Quechua word meaning "eye spring". To the flank of the lake, there is a hill with the archaeological remains of the Arwaturu.

History 
Furthest back in the known history of the Chupaca Province the Arwaturu tribe located alongside the lake named Ñawinpukyu constructed buildings from stone and mud that aligned to the north and to the south in such a way that they received all the rays from the sun.

See also 
 Qiwllaqucha

References

External links
 Municipal website

Junín Region